A list of films produced in Italy in 1999 (see 1999 in film):

See also
1999 in Italy
1994 in Italian television

External links
Italian films of 1999 at the Internet Movie Database

1999
Films
Italian